Argyle Secondary School is a high school and an arts program focused school in the Upper Lynn Valley school district of North Vancouver (District), in British Columbia, Canada. In the 2011–2012 school year, enrollment was 1,445.

Academics

Argyle offers courses in the humanities, sciences, language arts, business, fine and performing arts, and computer technology. They also offer French Immersion, the Digital Media Academy, a Co-op Program, and a Music Program from grade 8 to grade 12.

Digital Media Department
 Media Design
 Digital Media Development
 Media Arts
 Sound Recording & Design
 Film Production
 3D Animation & Modeling
 Game Design
 Visual Effects
 Graphic Design

Performing Arts: Theatre Department
 Drama (Acting)
 Theatre Company
 Directing & Script Development
 Theatre Production

Performing Arts: Music Department
 Concert Band Music
 Instrumental Music
 Jazz Band Music
 Vocal Choir
 Choral Music
 Vocal ensemble
 Orchestra Music
 Vocal Jazz Choir
 Chamber Choir
 Composition & Music Production

Technology Education Department
 Wood Design
 Architectural Drafting
 Woodwork
 Metalwork
 Art Metal & Jewellery
 Machining & Welding

Visual Arts Department
 General Art
 Art Studio
 Studio Arts 2D
 Studio Arts 3D

External Music Department
 Royal Conservatory of Music
 Victoria Conservatory of Music
 London College of Music
 BC Conservatory of Music
 Conservatory Canada Music
 Royal Schools of Music
 Trinity College London Music

External Dance Department
 Jazz Dance
 Tap Dance
 Ballet
 Cecchetti
 Modern Theatre Dance
 Highland Dancing
 Royal Academy of Dancing

Athletics
The school has teams in volleyball, field hockey, basketball, soccer, track and field, football, rugby, cheer, cross-country, curling, gymnastics, swimming, tennis, mountain biking, ultimate frisbee, and wrestling.

Argyle’s senior cheer team, also known as the Gold Team, went to the World Cheerleading Championships in 2017 and 2019. Both times they came second in the world and first in Canada.

History

In the fall of 2014, Argyle succumbed to a small flood due to heavy rainfall overnight. The flash flood, 100 millimeters in 24 hours, caused families to evacuate their homes. They traced the source back to a plug in one of the many creeks in the area, which then found another path to flow down which turned out to be Kilmer (where flooding was the worst) and then Fromme. The extent of the damage on the school was the inundation of nine classrooms and the drama department's prop room. The following morning school was canceled as professionals and families alike attempted to reduce the damage to the school. 

Argyle Secondary School was built in 1960, and has undergone renovations in 1966, 1969, and 2000. In June 2016 it was confirmed that the school would receive $47.5 million for seismic upgrades, $37.6 million from the province and $8.1 million from the school district. Construction was completed in January 2021 after many delays.

Notable alumni
 Bryan Adams, Singer-songwriter, photographer
 Taylor Curran, field hockey athlete, Olympian
 Godfrey Gao, actor
 Trevor Guthrie, Singer/songwriter
 Brett Hull, NHL player
 Paul Kariya, NHL player
 Darcy Michael, Comedian and actor
 Jason Priestley, actor
 Jessica Smith, track and field athlete, Olympian
 Jen and Sylvia Soska, directors and producers

References

External links
 Argyle Secondary

High schools in British Columbia
Educational institutions in Canada with year of establishment missing